Jurgen Vandeurzen (born 26 January 1974) is a former Belgian professional footballer who played as a midfielder. He spent most of his career in Belgium apart from a two-year spell playing in England for Stoke City.

Career
Vandeurzen made his debut for his local club Genk on 24 November 1991. A product of the club's youth teams, he is most often a replacement but nevertheless plays around thirty games during his first two seasons in professional football. From the 1993–94 season, Vandeurzen became a regular player in the Genk midfield. Unfortunately for him and for his team, Genk finished in last position and was relegated to the Belgian Second Division.

Vandeurzen remained loyal to his club after relegation but after one season, he lost his place in the Genk first team and, once promotion back to the Belgian First Division was achieved in 1995–96, he had to leave the club. He signed up with Second Division side Overpelt-Fabriek. After a catastrophic 1996–97 season, the club was relegated to the Belgian Third Division and Vandeurzen left for RFC Liège, where he has the tough task of succeeding Benoît Thans, who left for KVC Westerlo. He spent the 1997–98 season with RFC Liège, playing 29 times, scoring six goals as the team finished in seventh position and at the end of the campaign he joined Turnhout. Vandeurzen had three full seasons at Turnhout, playing over a hundred league games. Turnhout qualified each time for the promotion play-offs but were unable to secure a place in the First Division and were then relegated to the Third Division in 2000–01 after failing to secure a licence.

Vandeurzen moved to English Second Division club Stoke City in the summer of 2001 becoming the club's first Belgian footballer. He played a key role in 2001–02 playing in 48 matches scoring four goals as Stoke gained promotion to the second tier after beating Brentford 2–0 in the 2002 play-off Final. He played in 12 matches in 2002–03, scoring once in a 1–1 draw against Reading before being released in January 2003 where he returned to Belgium with Dessel Sport.

He stayed six months in Dessel playing ten matches. At the end of the season, he signed a contract with Patro Maasmechelen, another second-tier side. Vandeurzen became a regular member of the team and missed only one match during the 2003–04 season. He continued at the club but, because of his financial difficulties, he decided to leave in January 2005 and joined Beringen-Heusden-Zolder. Unfortunately, the club was also experiencing financial problems the following season and a year after moving from Maasmechelen to Heusden, Vandeurzen goes the other way and returned to his old club, now renamed Patro Eisden Maasmechelen and relegated to the Belgian Fourth Division. He remained two and a half years in the border town, without managing to go up to the Third Division. In September 2008, he joined KS Kermt-Hasselt and retired from playing semi-professional football at the end of the 2008–09 season. He played at amateur level with Bregel Sport whilst also doing coaching at the club from 2009 to 2011.

Managerial career
Vandeurzen was head coach at Limburg Provincial League side Eendracht Louwel from November 2017 until February 2020.

Career statistics
Source:

Honours
 Stoke City
 Football League Second Division play-off final winner: 2002

References

1974 births
Living people
Belgian footballers
K.R.C. Genk players
Lommel S.K. players
RFC Liège players
Stoke City F.C. players
English Football League players
KFC Turnhout players
K.F.C. Dessel Sport players
K. Patro Eisden Maasmechelen players
Sportspeople from Genk
Footballers from Limburg (Belgium)
Association football midfielders
Belgian Pro League players
Challenger Pro League players
Belgian expatriate sportspeople in England
Belgian expatriate footballers
Expatriate footballers in England